The Luxembourg Amateur Radio Union  (LARU) (in German, Luxemburger Amateur Radio Union, in French, Union des Radioamateurs du Luxembourg) is a national non-profit organization for amateur radio enthusiasts in Luxembourg
.
The LARU was founded on January 1, 2014. The LARU promotes technical progress and cohesion of amateur radio operators. The LARU sets priorities in emergency communications, digital voice communications, digital data transmission, science and education.

The LARU offers workshops dedicated to amateur radio, offers a radio course for the preparation of the amateur radio exam (HAREC and NOVICE), organises fielddays and ham-meetings, operates voice repeaters, APRS digipeaters, servers and gateways, activates special callsigns. The organization operates webpages dedicated to emergency communications

and DMR an open digital radio standard for professional mobile radio used in amateur radio
. The amateur radio club callsign of the LARU is LX9LARU. The LARU also uses the call LX4E for emergency operations and other special activities.

The LARU also operates the LARU LX QSL Bureau. Herewith the LARU supports amateur radio operators in Luxembourg and in the world by promoting the exchange of QSL cards.

Although the LARU is a national amateur radio organization representing the interests of amateur radio operators in Luxembourg, it is not a member of the IARU.

Amateur radio repeaters operated by the LARU 
 the LARU operates 6 DMR repeaters and 2 APRS repeaters.

References 

International Amateur Radio Union member societies
Clubs and societies in Luxembourg
Radio in Luxembourg